Emma Roca Rodríguez (12 August 1973 – 18 June 2021) was a Spanish Catalan ski mountaineer and an eco-challenge member. She represented Spain which she was a captain, she helped her team to get in the top 10 spot.

Roca worked as a firefighter and taught  biomechanics at university. She lived in Talló, Lleida.

Roca died on 18 June 2021 from vulvar cancer at the age of 47.

Emma's ultrarunning achievements included Emma winning the Costa Brava Stage Run 85km, the Trail Vall de Ribes 65km, the Trail Andorra La Sportiva 65k, the Run Rabbit Run 100 mile and the Leadville Trail 100 mile. She took second at the Hardrock 100 and Ultra-Trail Penyagolosa, placed third at UTMB (the Ultra Trail Mont Blanc, considered by many to be the ultimate ultra marathon) and the Ultra Trail Australia, and took fifth at the Western States 100 mile.

Selected results 

 1998
 Land Rover Trophy as part of Team Spain, Camel Trophy Tierra del Fuego '98

 2000
 2nd, Trofeo Kima

 2002
 3rd, Trofeo Kima

 2004
 2nd, Open International, San Carlos de Bariloche

 2005
 8th, World Cup team (together with Cristina Bes Ginesta)

 2008
 7th (and 5th in the "civilian international women" ranking), Patrouille des Glaciers (together with Cristina Bes Ginesta and Izaskun Zubizarreta Guerendiain)

 2010
 1st, Adventure Racing World Championship, Team Buff Thermacool (together with Benjamen Midena, Fran Lopez Costoya, Arnau Julia)

Ultramarathon 

 2010
1st, World Raid Championship,
 2011
 2nd, Marathon des Sables, Morocco
 2nd, Cavalls del Vent
 2012
 3rd, Ultra Trail de Mont Blanc (UTMB)
 2013
 3rd, Ultra Trail de Mont Blanc (UTMB)
 2015
 5th, Weston States

Ski Mountaineering Championships 

 2002
 2nd, Spanish Championship Ski Mountaineering

 2004
 5th, World Championship relay race (together with Cristina Bes Ginesta and Iolanda García Sàez)
 10th, World Championship Ski Mountaineering team race (together with Cristina Bes Ginesta)

 2005
 1st, Spanish Championship Ski Mountaineering team (together with Cristina Bes Ginesta)
 5th, European Championship Ski Mountaineering team race (together with Cristina Bes Ginesta)
 5th, European Championship Ski Mountaineering relay race (together with Cristina Bes Ginesta and Sara Gros Aspiroz) 
 10th, European Championship Ski Mountaineering single race

 2008
 5th, World Championship Ski Mountaineering relay race (together with Cristina Bes Ginesta, Gemma Arró Ribot and Izaskun Zubizarreta Guerendiain)
 7th, World Championship Ski Mountaineering team race (together with Izaskun Zubizarreta Guerendiain)
 10th, World Championship Ski Mountaineering long distance

Pierra Menta 

 2002
5th, together with Cristina Bes Ginesta

 2005
 4th, together with Jeannie Wall

 2008
 6th, together with Cristina Bes Ginesta

References

External links 
 Emma Roca Rodríguez at skimountaineering.org

1973 births
2021 deaths
Spanish female ski mountaineers
Sportspeople from Barcelona
Ski mountaineers from Catalonia
Participants in American reality television series
20th-century Spanish women